"Find Out What's Happenin'" is a song written by Jerry Crutchfield and recorded by Bobby Bare for his 1968 album The English Country Side, which he recorded with a group from England called The Hillsiders. The song peaked at number 15 on the Billboard Hot Country Singles chart.

In 1970, a cover version by Barbara Fairchild, recorded for her album Someone Special, reached number 52 on the Billboard Hot Country Singles chart that year. The song was also done as a cover by Elvis Presley on his 1973 album, Raised on Rock.  In 1993, the song was recorded as the title track to Pearl River's debut album. In 1995, Tanya Tucker covered the song and released it the second single from her album Fire to Fire. It reached number 40 on the Billboard Hot Country Singles & Tracks chart that year.

Chart performance

Bobby Bare

Barbara Fairchild

Tanya Tucker

References

1968 songs
1968 singles
1970 singles
1995 singles
Bobby Bare songs
Barbara Fairchild songs
Elvis Presley songs
Tanya Tucker songs
Songs written by Jerry Crutchfield
Song recordings produced by Chet Atkins
Song recordings produced by Billy Sherrill
Song recordings produced by Jerry Crutchfield
Liberty Records singles